Bloodline (also known as Sidney Sheldon's Bloodline) is a 1979 thriller film directed by Terence Young from a screenplay by Laird Koenig, based on the 1977 novel of the same name by Sidney Sheldon. It was the only R-rated film ever made by its star, Audrey Hepburn.

Plot
Sam Roffe, President of Roffe & Sons Pharmaceuticals, dies in what appears to be a climbing accident, leaving his daughter Elizabeth (Audrey Hepburn) a billion-dollar empire. Roffe's board members see an opportunity to settle old scores, jockey for higher position, and reap lucrative profits. However, an investigation into Sam's death discloses that it was a murder and that a power struggle is going on within the company.

Lead investigator Max Hornung (Gert Fröbe) informs Elizabeth of his list of suspects, which includes her closest advisers and financially strapped family members. During this time, she marries CEO Rhys Williams (Ben Gazzara), but he, too, is identified by Hornung as a suspect. As president, Elizabeth follows her father's wishes and refuses to let shares of Roffe & Sons sell on the world market. Her choice prevents the board members from selling their shares as the company's by-laws prohibit it until all board members agree; on the other hand, her death would allow for a unanimous decision.

After several attempts on her life, an international chase across Europe ensues. Hornung is able to connect these murder attempts to a series of homicides of prostitutes, which have been recorded on snuff films by using Roffe film stock. He has a witness in a black Gucci leather coat (several suspects are linked to this coat).

Elizabeth returns to her father's villa in Sardinia during a sirocco for protection from the unseen murderer, who sets her house on fire after she begins destroying objects and shouting, "Now try to make it look like an accident!" Williams and one of the shareholders, Sir Alec Nichols (James Mason), both show up to save her, but Hornung figures out that Nichols is the killer and shoots him before he can murder Elizabeth in a symbolic snuff film.

Cast
Audrey Hepburn as Elizabeth Roffe
Ben Gazzara as Rhys Williams
James Mason as Sir Alec Nichols
Claudia Mori as Donatella
Irene Papas as Simonetta Palazzi
Michelle Phillips as Vivian Nichols
Maurice Ronet as Charles Martin
Romy Schneider as Hélène Martin
Omar Sharif as Ivo Palazzi
Beatrice Straight as Kate Erling
Gert Fröbe as Inspector Max Hornung
Marcel Bozzuffi as Man in Black
Pinkas Braun as Dr. Wal
Ivan Desny as Jeweller
Vadim Glowna as Dr. Joeppli
Walter Kohut as Krauss
Wolfgang Preiss as Julius Prager
Hans von Borsody as Peasant Guard
Charles Millot as Commissaire Bloche

Production
Paramount paid Sidney Sheldon $1.25 million plus ten percent of the box office gross for the movie rights to his novel before it was published. According to producer Sidney Beckerman, this was a record sum paid by a movie studio for the rights to a book until Peter Benchley was paid a reported $2 million for the film rights to The Island a short time later. John Frankenheimer was originally set to direct, but left the project to work on Prophecy instead and was replaced by Terence Young. Jacqueline Bisset was approached about playing the lead role, but it went instead to Audrey Hepburn, who was considerably older than Elizabeth Roffe in the novel so the part was rewritten for her. Filming took place from October 8 to December 22, 1978 in New York City, London, Surrey, Paris, Sardinia, Rome and several locations in West Germany.

Reception
Vincent Canby of The New York Times wrote "As he demonstrated in his James Bond films (Dr. No, From Russia With Love and Thunderball), Terence Young is a director of some comic style, but though Bloodline is often laughable, it has no sense of humor. It's the kind of fiction that is glumly disapproving of its own sordid details, such as one about a lady who has her knees nailed to the floor (offscreen) for not paying her gambling debts." Roger Ebert wrote: "After six months, a week, and two days of suspense, we can now relax: The worst movie of 1979 has opened ... See Sidney Sheldon's Bloodline, and weep for the cinema." Gene Siskel of the Chicago Tribune gave the film one-and-a-half stars out of four and called it "trash," writing of Hepburn that "she has so much class that you sit there wondering what a woman like her is doing in a movie like this." Variety stated "'Bloodline' is bloodless. With a plot that becomes more ludicrous the more one thinks about it, this Geria production for Par release plays woodenly." Kevin Thomas of the Los Angeles Times wrote "As an unabashed potboiler it's suitably lurid and preposterous, but unfortunately it merely simmers. The task of making clear the heavily populated, incredibly thick plot of Sheldon's best seller requires so much exposition—and so much zigzagging over Europe—that adaptor Laird Koenig and director Terence Young have scant opportunity to develop characters or work in much action. It's amusing but isn't nearly as much fun as pictures of this kind should be." Gary Arnold of The Washington Post called the film "surely one of the most perfunctory murder mysteries ever committed to foolscap. Not a bloody thing ever develops. After lining up the characters, Sheldon doggedly shifts scenes, suspects and red herrings until accumulating enough pages to call it a hefty read." Jack Kroll wrote in Newsweek that "if I were Sidney Sheldon, I'd demand to have my name removed from the title of this torpid turkey ... Junk movies should be fun - this one is just dumb."

Extended version
An extended version of 155 minutes has been shown on network TV. This cut gives more clarity to certain plot points, especially those involving James Mason's character.

References

External links
 
 

1979 films
1979 crime films
1970s business films
1970s crime thriller films
1970s mystery thriller films
Adaptations of works by Sidney Sheldon
American business films
American crime thriller films
American mystery thriller films
1970s English-language films
English-language German films
Films about businesspeople
Films about inheritances
Films about snuff films
Films based on American thriller novels
Films directed by Terence Young
Films scored by Ennio Morricone
Films set in country houses
Films set in Sardinia
Films set in Switzerland
Films set in Poland
Films shot at Cinecittà Studios
Films shot in Denmark
Films shot in London
Films shot in Munich
Films shot in New York City
Films shot in Paris
Films shot in Sardinia
German crime thriller films
German mystery thriller films
Paramount Pictures films
West German films
1970s American films
1970s German films